During the 2001–02 English football season, Southampton Football Club competed in the Premier League. Initially under Stuart Gray and then Gordon Strachan from October, they finished 11th in the Premier League and reached the third round of the FA Cup.

Season summary
The move to St Mary's Stadium was seen as the way forward for Southampton after 103 years at the dilapidated Dell, but a terrible start to the season saw relegation looking certain and cost manager Stuart Gray his job after barely six months in charge. His successor was Gordon Strachan, who had just left Coventry City. Strachan quickly turned Southampton's fortunes round, and they gradually climbed to a secure 11th place in the final table.

At the end of the season, Matthew Le Tissier retired, bringing to an end his 16-year playing career for Southampton. He remained at the club as a coach.

Final league table

Results
Southampton's score comes first

Legend

FA Premier League

FA Cup

League Cup

Players

First-team squad
Squad at end of season

Left club during season

Reserve squad

Transfers

In

Out

Transfers in:  £11,950,000
Transfers out:  £9,800,000
Total spending:  £2,150,000

Loan in

Loan out

Statistics

Appearances and goals

|-
! colspan=14 style=background:#dcdcdc; text-align:center| Goalkeepers

|-
! colspan=14 style=background:#dcdcdc; text-align:center| Defenders

|-
! colspan=14 style=background:#dcdcdc; text-align:center| Midfielders

|-
! colspan=14 style=background:#dcdcdc; text-align:center| Forwards

|-
! colspan=14 style=background:#dcdcdc; text-align:center| Players transferred out during the season

|-

Starting 11
Considering starts in all competitions

References

Southampton F.C. seasons
Southampton